Robert John Struthers (1879–1959) was an English footballer who played in the Football League for Bolton Wanderers with whom he played in the 1904 FA Cup Final, losing 1–0 to Manchester City.

References

1879 births
1959 deaths
English footballers
Association football defenders
English Football League players
Everton F.C. players
Gravesend United F.C. players
Portsmouth F.C. players
Bolton Wanderers F.C. players
Bradford (Park Avenue) A.F.C. players
FA Cup Final players
Footballers from Liverpool